Make Some Noise may refer to:

 Make Some Noise (campaign), a campaign by Amnesty International using music by John Lennon to promote human rights
 Make Some Noise (EP), an EP by Big Big Train
 Make Some Noise (Liquid Soul album)
 Make Some Noise (Krystal Meyers album)
 "Make Some Noise" (Krystal Meyers song), 2008
 Make Some Noise (The Dead Daisies album), 2016
 "Make Some Noise" (Hannah Montana song), 2007 
 "Make Some Noise" (Beastie Boys song), 2011
 Make Some Noise, a 2022 Dropout game show